The African Journal of Library, Archives and Information Science is a peer-reviewed academic journal covering library science with an emphasis on the African setting. The journal is abstracted and indexed by Library Literature and Information Science and Library and Information Science Abstracts.

External links 
 

Information science journals
Publications established in 1991
Biannual journals
English-language journals
1991 establishments in Nigeria